Verdigre is a village in Knox County, Nebraska, United States. The population was 575 at the 2010 census.

History
Verdigre was platted in 1887 shortly before the Fremont, Elkhorn and Missouri Valley Railroad was extended to that point. It took its name from nearby Verdigre Creek.

Verdigre was the site of a fatal injury during a professional wrestling tag team match on June 13, 1971, when Alberto Torres was hurt while competing against Ox Baker.  Torres died of a ruptured appendix four days after being hurt.

Geography
Verdigre is located at  (42.596437, -98.034118).

Demographics

2010 census
As of the census of 2010, there were 575 people, 246 households, and 126 families living in the village. The racial makeup of the village was 96.3% White, 1.9% Native American, and 1.7% from two or more races. Hispanic or Latino of any race were 0.2% of the population.

There was 246 households, of which 18.3% had children under the age of 18 living with them, 41.9% are married couples living together, 6.1% had a female householder with no husband present, 3.3% had a male householder with no wife present, and 48.8% were non-families. 48.0% of all households were made up of individuals, and 29.6% had someone living alone who was 65 years of age or older. The average household size was 1.94 and the average family size was 2.74.

The median age in the village was 56.7 years. 15.3% of residents were under the age of 18; 3.8% were between the ages of 18 and 24; 14% were from 25 to 44; 26.3% were from 45 to 64; and 40.7% were 65 years of age or older. The gender makeup of the village was 46.1% male and 53.9% female.

2000 census
As of the census of 2000, there were 519 people, 232 households, and 122 families living in the village. The population density was 934.1 people per square mile (357.8/km). There were 286 housing units at an average density of 514.7 per square mile (197.2/km). The racial makeup of the village was 97.88% White, 1.93% Native American, and 0.19% from two or more races.

There were 232 households, out of which 19.0% had children under the age of 18 living with them, 47.4% were married couples living together, 4.7% had a female householder with no husband present, and 47.4% were non-families. 45.7% of all households were made up of individuals, and 34.1% had someone living alone who was 65 years of age or older. The average household size was 1.92 and the average family size was 2.71.

In the village, the population was spread out, with 15.2% under the age of 18, 3.9% from 18 to 24, 16.2% from 25 to 44, 19.3% from 45 to 64, and 45.5% who were 65 years of age or older. The median age was 59 years. For every 100 females, there were 83.4 males. For every 100 females age 18 and over, there were 76.0 males.

As of 2000 the median income for a household in the village was $21,667, and the median income for a family was $30,208. Males had a median income of $22,031 versus $12,708 for females. The per capita income for the village was $18,128. About 4.7% of families and 10.0% of the population were below the poverty line, including 2.9% of those under age 18 and 19.0% of those age 65 or over.

Kolach Days
Verdigre touts itself as "The Kolach Capital of the world". A kolach is a pastry of Czech and Slovak origin, with a fruit center, usually poppy seed, prunes, cherries, or blueberries, somewhat similar to a Danish. During the summer, usually the second week of June, Verdigre hosts a huge festival celebrating the kolach and usually provides rides, tractor pulls, both duck and turtle races, live music, mud volleyball, kolach eating contests, and a variety of activities for the community. Verdigre crowns its annual Kolach Queen during this festival. Kolaches are sold in the local bakery and a variety of local wares and produce are available at outdoor stalls on Main street.
The city elects Kolach Royalty ( both King and Queen ) during the festivities.

Notable people
Pauline Davis - California state legislator
William R. Schmidt (1889–1966) - major general in the United States Army during World War II.

References

External links
 City website
 School website

Villages in Knox County, Nebraska
Villages in Nebraska
Czech-American culture in Nebraska